CFOI-FM (104.1 MHz) is a Canadian FM radio station that broadcasts a Christian radio format in Quebec City, Quebec. 
Owned by Association d'Églises baptistes reformées du Québec (Baptist Reformed Church Association of Quebec), the station received CRTC approval on January 24, 2007.

On November 18, 2009, CFOI-FM applied to change its frequency from 96.9 to 104.1 MHz, which received CRTC approval on February 19, 2010.

On December 3, 2010, CFOI-FM applied to add a new FM broadcast relay station transmitter at 102.9 MHz in Saint-Jérôme, Quebec, which received approval on January 21, 2011.

References

External links
www.foifm.com
 

Foi
Foi
Radio stations established in 2007
2007 establishments in Quebec